This is a list of encyclopedias as well as encyclopedic and biographical dictionaries published on the subject of biology in any language.

Entries are in the English language unless specifically stated as otherwise.

General biology 
Becher, Anne, Joseph Richey. American environmental leaders: From colonial times to the present. Grey House, 2008. .
Butcher, Russell D., Stephen E. Adair, Lynn A. Greenwalt. America's national wildlife refuges: A complete guide. Roberts Rinehart Publishers in cooperation with Ducks Unlimited, 2003. .

Ecological Internet, Inc. EcoEarth.info: Environment portal and search engine. Ecological Internet, Inc. .

Friday, Adrian & Davis S. Ingram. The Cambridge Encyclopedia of Life Sciences. Cambridge, 1985.
Gaither, Carl C., Alma E. Cavazos-Gaither, Andrew Slocombe. Naturally speaking: A dictionary of quotations on biology, botany, nature and zoology. Institute of Physics, 2001. .
Gibson, Daniel, National Audubon Society. Audubon guide to the national wildlife refuges. Southwest: Arizona, Nevada, New Mexico, Texas. St. Martin's Griffin, 2000. .
Goudie, Andrew, David J. Cuff. Encyclopedia of global change: Environmental change and human society. Oxford University Press, 2002. .
Gove, Doris. Audubon guide to the national wildlife refuges. Southeast : Alabama, Florida, Georgia, Kentucky, Mississippi, North Carolina, Puerto Rico, South Carolina, Tennessee, U.S. Virgin Islands. St. Martin's Griffin, 2000. .
Grassy, John. Audubon guide to the national wildlife refuges: Northern Midwest: Illinois, Indiana, Iowa, Michigan, Minnesota, Nebraska, North Dakota, Ohio, South Dakota, Wisconsin. St. Martin's Griffin, c2000. .
Grassy, John. Audubon guide to the national wildlife refuges: Rocky Mountains: Colorado, Idaho, Montana, Utah, Wyoming. St. Martin's Griffin, 2000. .
Gray, Peter. Encyclopedia of the Biological Sciences. Krieger, 1981.
Grinstein, Louise S., Carol A. Biermann, Rose K. Rose. Women in the biological sciences: A biobibliographic sourcebook. Greenwood Press, 1997. .
Hancock, John M., Marketa J. Zvelebil. Dictionary of bioinformatics and computational biology. Wiley-Liss, 2004. .
Hosansky, David. The environment A to Z. CQ Press, 2001. .
Laubach, René. Audubon guide to the national wildlife refuges. New England : Connecticut, Maine, Massachusetts, New Hampshire, Rhode Island, Vermont. St. Martin's Griffin, 2000. .
Mac Arthur, Loren, Debbie S. Miller. Audubon guide to the national wildlife refuges. Alaska and the Northwest: Alaska, Oregon, Washington. St. Martin's Griffin, 2000. .
Mac Arthur, Loren. Audubon guide to the national wildlife refuges. California & Hawaii : California, Hawaii. St. Martin's Griffin, 2000. .
Marinelli, Janet, Stephen K.-M. Tim, Brooklyn Botanic Garden. The Brooklyn Botanic Garden gardener's desk reference. Henry Holt, 1998. .
McAinish, T. F. Physics in Medicine & Biology Encyclopedia. Pergamon Press, 1986.
 
Munn, R. E. Encyclopedia of global environmental change. Wiley, 2002. .
National Academy of Sciences. Biographical memoirs of the national academy of sciences. National Academy of Sciences. .
Nature Publishing Group. Encyclopedia of life sciences. Nature Publishing Group, 2002. .
Niergenberg, William Aaron, Edward O. Wilson, Peter H. Raven. Encyclopedia of environmental biology. Academic Press, 1995. .
Nybakken, James Willard, William W. Broenkow, T. L. Vallier. Interdisciplinary encyclopedia of marine sciences. Grolier Academic Reference, 2003. .
O'Daly, Anne. Encyclopedia of life sciences. Marshall Cavendish, 2004. .
Palmer, William, National Audubon Society. Audubon guide to the national wildlife refuges. South Central: Arkansas, Kansas, Louisiana, Missouri, Oklahoma. St. Martin's Griffin, 2000. .
Pilch, Richard F., Raymond A. Zilinskas. Encyclopedia of bioterrorism defense. Wiley-LISS, 2005. .
Polunin, Nicholas, Lynn M. Curme. World who is who and does what in environment and conservation. St. Martin's Press; Foundation for Environmental Conservation, 1997. .
Porter, Roy, Marilyn Bailey Ogilvie. The biographical dictionary of scientists. Oxford University Press, 2000. .
Ricciuti, Edward R. Audubon guide to the national wildlife refuges. Mid-Atlantic: Delaware, Maryland, New Jersey, New York, Pennsylvania, Virginia, West Virginia. St. Martin's Griffin, 2000. .

Royal Society (Great Britain). Biographical memoirs of fellows of the royal society. Royal Society, 1955–. .
Shearer, Benjamin F., Barbara Smith Shearer. Notable women in the life sciences: a biographical dictionary. Greenwood Press, 1996. .
Sterling, Keir B. Biographical dictionary of American and Canadian naturalists and environmentalists. Greenwood Press, 1997. .
U. S. Department of Energy, Office of Scientific and Technical Information. Science.gov. U. S. Dept. of Energy, Office of Scientific and Technical Information, 2002-. .
Wexler, Philip, Bruce D. Anderson, Ann de Peyster. Encyclopedia of toxicology. Elsevier Academic, 2005. .

Lifeforms 
Association for Biodiversity Information. NatureServe explorer: An online encyclopedia of life. NatureServe. .
Beacham, Walton, Frank V. Castronova, Suzanne Sessine. Beacham's guide to the endangered species of North America. Gale Group, 2001. .
Center for Applied Biodiversity Science. Biodiversity hotspots. Conservation International. .
Field Museum of Natural History. The encyclopedia of life: EOL. Encyclopedia of Life, 2007-. .
Henry, Helen L., Anthony W. Norman. Encyclopedia of hormones. Academic Press, 2003. .
IUCN Invasive Species Specialist Group. Global invasive species database. IUCN Invasive Species Specialist Group. 2000-. .
Levin, Simon A. Encyclopedia of biodiversity. Academic Press, 2001. .
Pagel, Mark D. Encyclopedia of evolution. Oxford University Press, 2002. . .
Polistes Foundation. Discover life. Polistes Corporation, 1999-. .
Tree of Life Web Project. Tree of life. University of Arizona. .
World Wildlife Fund. World wildlife fund. World Wildlife Fund. .

Animals 
Audubon Society Encyclopedia of Animal Life. Clarkson N. Potter, 1982.
Bekoff, Marc, Jane Goodall. Encyclopedia of animal behavior. Greenwood Press, 2004. .
Bruce, Jenni. The encyclopedia of animals: A complete visual guide. University of California Press, 2004. .
Burton, Maurice, Robert Burton. International wildlife encyclopedia. Marshall Cavendish, 2002. .
Encyclopedia of Animal Behavior. Facts on File, 1987.
Encyclopedia of Animal Biology. Facts on File, 1987.
Encyclopedia of Animal Ecology. Facts on File, 1987.
Encyclopedia of Animal Evolution. Facts on File, 1987.
Grzimek, Bernhard. Grzimek's Animal Life Encyclopedia. Van Nostrand, 1972–1975.
Grzimek's Encyclopedia of Ethology. Van Nostrand, 1972–1977.
The Illustrated Encyclopedia of Wildlife. Grey Castle Press, 1991.
Knobil, Ernst and Jimmy D. Neill. Encyclopedia of reproduction. Academic Press, 1998. .
Macmillan Illustrated Animal Encyclopedia. Macmillan, 1984.
Marshall Cavendish International Wildlife Encyclopedia. Marshall Cavendish, 1990.
Nowak, Ronald M., David W. Macdonald, Roland W. Kays. Walker's carnivores of the world. Johns Hopkins University Press, 2005. .
The Oxford Companion to Animal Behaviour. Oxford, 1987.
World Nature Encyclopedia. Raintree/Steck-Vaughn, 1989.

Aquatic 
Banister, Keith & Andrew Campbell. The Encyclopedia of Aquatic Life. Facts on File, 1985.
Dakin, Nick. Macmillan Book of the Marine Aquarium. Macmillan, 1993.
The Encyclopedia of Marine Invertebrates. T. F. H. Publications, 1983.
Folkens, Pieter A., Randall R. Reeves, National Audubon Society. Guide to marine mammals of the world. A. A. Knopf, 2002. .
George, David and Jennifer. Marine Life: An Illustrated Encyclopedia of Invertebrates in the Sea. Wiley, 1979.
Halstead, Bruce. Dangerous Aquatic Animals of the World: A Color Atlas. Darwin Press, 1992.
Sterba, Gunther. The Aquarium Encyclopedia. MIT Press, 1983.
Stickney, Robert R. Encyclopedia of aquaculture. Wiley, 2000. .

Fishes 
Dr. Axelrod's Atlas of Freshwater Aquarium Fishes. T. F. H. Publications, 6th ed., 1991.
Dr. Burgess's Mini-Atlas of Freshwater Aquarium Fishes. T. F. H. Publications, 1991.
Eschmeyer, William N., Earl Stanndard Herald, Howard Hammann. A field guide to Pacific Coast fishes of North America: From the Gulf of Alaska to Baja, California. Houghton Mifflin, 1983. .
Froese, R., D. Pauly International Center for Living Aquatic Resources Management. FishBase: A global information system on fishes. FishBase, [2000?]-. .
Gilbert, Carter Rowell, James D. Williams, National Audubon Society. National Audubon Society field guide to fishes. Alfred A. Knopf, 2002. .
Goldstein, Robert J., Rodney W. Harper, Richard Edwards. American aquarium fishes. Texas A&M University Press, 2000. .
Page, Lawrence M., Brooks M. Burr, Eugene C. Beckham III, National Audubon Society. A field guide to freshwater fishes: North America north of Mexico. Houghton Mifflin, 1991. .
Paxton, John R., William N. Eschmeyer, David Kirshner. Encyclopedia of fishes. Academic Press, 1998. .

Arthropods

Insects 
Audubon Society Book of Insects. Abrams, 1983.
Capinera, John L. Encyclopedia of entomology. Kluwer Academic, 2004. .
Johnson, Warren T., Howard H. Lyon, C. S. Koehler. Insects that feed on trees and shrubs. Comstock Publishing Associates, 1991. .
Marshall, S. A. Insects: Their natural history and diversity; With a photographic guide to insects of eastern North America. Firefly Books, 2006. .
Milne, Lorus Johnson, Margery Joan Greene Milne, Susan Rayfield. The Audubon Society field guide to North American insects and spiders. Knopf, 1980. .
O'Toole, Christopher. The Encyclopedia of Insects. Facts on File, 1986.
Pyle, Robert Michael, Carol Nehring, Jane Opper, National Audubon Society. The Audubon Society field guide to North American butterflies. Knopf, 1981. .
Resh, Vincent H., Ring T. Cardé. Encyclopedia of insects. Academic Press, 2003. .
Solomon, J. D., U.S. Dept. of Agriculture, Forest Service. Guide to insect borers in North American broadleaf trees and shrubs. U.S. Dept. of Agriculture, Forest Service, 1995.

Birds 
Alderfer, Jonathan K., National Geographic Society (U. S.). National Geographic complete birds of North America. National Geographic, 2006. .
American Ornithologists' Union, Academy of Natural Sciences of Philadelphia, Cornell University. The birds of North America. American Ornithologists' Union, 1992–2002. .
Cambridge Encyclopedia of Ornithology. Cambridge, 1991.
Campbell, Bruce and Elizabeth Lack. Dictionary of Birds. Buteo, rev. ed., 1985.
Clark, William S., Brian K. Wheeler. A field guide to hawks of North America. Houghton Mifflin, 2001. .
Cornell University. All about birds. Cornell Laboratory of Ornithology. .
del Hoyo, Josep, Andrew Elliott, Jordi Sargatal. Handbook of the birds of the world. Lynx Edicions, 1992–2006. .
Dunn, Jon, Jonathan K. Alderfer, National Geographic Society (U.S.). National Geographic field guide to the birds of North America. National Geographic, 2006. .
Ferguson-Lees, David A. Christie, Kim Franklin. Raptors of the world. Houghton Mifflin, 2001. .
Fuller, Errol. Extinct birds. Comstock, 2001. .
Montagu, George (1802). Ornithological Dictionary; or Alphabetical Synopsis of British Birds, London: J. White.
 
Perrins, Christopher. Illustrated Encyclopedia of Birds. Prentice Hall, 1991.
Perrins, Christopher and Alex Middleton. Encyclopedia of Birds. Facts on File, 1985.
Robbins, Chandler S., Bertel Bruun, Herbert Spencer Zim. Birds of North America: A guide to field identification. St. Martin's Press, 2001. .
Sibley, David. The Sibley field guide to birds of eastern North America. Alfred A. Knopf, 2003. .
Sibley, David. The Sibley field guide to birds of western North America. Alfred A. Knopf, 2003. .
Sibley, David, Chris Elphick, John B. Dunning, National Audubon Society. The Sibley guide to bird life and behavior. Alfred A. Knopf, 2001. .
Sibley, David. The Sibley guide to birds. Alfred A. Knopf, 2000. .
Terres, John K. Audubon Society Encyclopedia of North American Birds. Knopf, 1991.

Endangered species 
Endangered Wildlife of the World. Marshall Cavendish, 1993.
The Grolier World Encyclopedia of Endangered Species. Grolier, 1992.
Lowe, David W., John R. Matthews, Charles J. Moseley, World Wildlife Fund. The official World Wildlife Fund guide to endangered species of North America. Beacham, 1990–1994. .
Official World Wildlife Fund Guide to Endangered Species. Beacham, 1990–1992.

Mammals 
Beacham, Walton, Kirk H. Beetz. Beacham's guide to international endangered species. Beacham, 1998–2001. .
Elbroch, Mark. Mammal tracks and sign: A guide to North American species. Stackpole Books, 2003. .
Folkens, Pieter A., Randall R. Reeves, National Audubon Society. Guide to marine mammals of the world. A. A. Knopf, 2002. .
Grzimek, Bernhard. Grzimek's Encyclopedia of Mammals. McGraw-Hill, 2nd ed., 1990. .
Macdonald, David. Encyclopedia of Mammals. Facts on File, 2006. .
Mammals: A Multimedia Encyclopedia. National Geographic Society/IBM, 1990.
Nowak, Ronald. Walker's Mammals of the World. Johns Hopkins University Press, 1991. .
Reid, Fiona, National Audubon Society. A field guide to mammals of North America, north of Mexico. Houghton Mifflin, 2006. .
Whitaker, John O., National Audubon Society. National Audubon Society field guide to North American mammals. Knopf, 1996. .
Wilson, Don E., Sue Ruff, American Society of Mammalogists. The Smithsonian book of North American mammals. Smithsonian Institution Press, 1999. .

Canines 

American Kennel Club. The complete dog book: Official publication of the American Kennel Club. Ballantine Books, 2006. .

De Prisco, Andrew and James B. Johnson. Canine Lexicon. T. F. H. Publications, 1993.

Morris, Desmond. Dogs: The ultimate dictionary of over 1,000 dog breeds. Trafalgar Square, 2002. .

Cats 
Kelsey-Wood, Dennis. The Atlas of Cats of the World: Domesticated and Wild. T. F. H. Publications, 1989.

Cattle 
Felius, Marleen. Cattle breeds: An encyclopedia. Misset, 1995. .

Horses 
Ensminger, M. F. The Complete Encyclopedia of Horses. A. S. Barnes, 1977.
Griffin, James and Tom Gore. Horse Owner's Veterinary Handbook. Howell Book House, 1989.

Kidd, Jane. International Encyclopedia of Horse Breeds. H. P. Books, 1986.
Kidd, Jane. International Encyclopedia of Horse Breeds & Breeding. Crescent Books, 1989.

Primates 
Jacobsen, Lawrence, Raymond Hamel, Cynthia Robinson, Wisconsin Primate Research Center. Primate info net. Wisconsin Primate Research Center, University of Wisconsin. .

Human 
Blakemore, Colin, Sheila Jennett, Alan Cuthbert. The Oxford companion to the body. Oxford University Press, 2001. .
Cooper, David N., Nature Publishing Group. Nature encyclopedia of the human genome. Nature Publishing Group, 2003. .
Dulbecco, Renato. Encyclopedia of Human Biology. Academic Press, 1991.
Kristic, Radivoj V. Illustrated Encyclopedia of Human Histology. Springer-Verlag, 1984.
Ramachandran, V. S. Encyclopedia of the human brain. Academic Press, 2002. .
Ulijaszek, Stanley J., Francis E. Johnston, M. A. Preece. The Cambridge encyclopedia of human growth and development. Cambridge University Press, 1998. .

Human evolution 
Jones, Stephen. Cambridge Encyclopedia of Human Evolution. Cambridge, 1993.
Milner, Richard. Encyclopedia of Evolution: Humanity's Search for Its Origins. Facts on File, 1990.
Tattersall, Ian. The Encyclopedia of Human Evolution and Prehistory. Garland. .

Reptiles and Amphibians 
Behler, John L., F. Wayne King, National Audubon Society. The Audubon Society field guide to North American reptiles and amphibians. Knopf, 1979. .
Bonin, Franck, Bernard Devaux, Alain Dupré. Turtles of the world. Johns Hopkins University Press, 2006. .
Campbell, Jonathan A., William W. Lamar, Edmund D. Brodie III. The venomous reptiles of the Western Hemisphere. Comstock, 2004. .
Center for North American Herpetology. Center for North American herpetology: Promoting the preservation and conservation of North American amphibians, crocodilians, reptiles, and turtles through scholarship and information. Center for North American Herpetology. .
Conant, Roger, Joseph T. Collins, Isabelle Hunt Conant. A field guide to reptiles and amphibians: Eastern and central North America. Houghton Mifflin, 1998. .
Ernst, Carl H. Evelyn M. Ernst. Snakes of the United States and Canada. Smithsonian Books, 2003. .
Halliday, Tim and Kraig Alder. The Encyclopedia of Reptiles and Amphibians. Facts on File, 1986.
Rossi, John, Roxanne Rossi. Snakes of the United States and Canada: Natural history and care in captivity. Krieger, 2003. .
Smith, Hobart Muir. Handbook of lizards: Lizards of the United States and of Canada. Comstock, 1995. .
Stebbins, Robert C. A field guide to western reptiles and amphibians. Houghton Mifflin, 2003. .

Bacteria

Fungi 
Hall, Ian R. Edible and poisonous mushrooms of the world. Timber Press, 2003. .
Kuo, Michael, John David Moore, Darvin DeShazer. 100 edible mushrooms. University of Michigan Press, 2007. .
Kuo, Michael. MushroomExpert.com. Michael Kuo, 2000-. . 2000–.
Lincoff, Gary, Carol Nehring, National Audubon Society. The Audubon Society field guide to North American mushrooms. Knopf, 1981. .
McKnight, Kent H., Vera B. McKnight, National Audubon Society. A field guide to mushrooms, North America. Houghton Mifflin, 1998. .
Phillips, Roger, Geoffrey Kibby, Nicky Foy. Mushrooms and other fungi of North America. Firefly Books, 2005. .
Turner, Nancy J., Adam F. Szczawinski. Common poisonous plants and mushrooms of North America. Timber Press, 1991. .

Plants 
Bailey, Liberty Hyde & Ethel Zoe Bailey. Hortus Third: A Concise Dictionary of Plants Cultivated in the United States and Canada. Macmillan, 3rd ed., 1976.
Barker, Joan. The encyclopedia of North American wild flowers. Parragon, 2004. .
Beckett, Kenneth A. The RHS Encyclopedia of House Plants Including Greenhouse Plants. Salem House, 1987.
Brickell, Christopher. The American Horticultural Society Encyclopedia of Garden Plants. Macmillan, 1989.
Brickell, Christopher, Trevor J. Cole, American Horticultural Society. American Horticultural Society encyclopedia of plants and flowers. DK Publishing, 2002. .
Burrows, George E. Toxic plants of North America. Wiley-Blackwell, 2012. , .
Dirr, Michael. Dirr's hardy trees and shrubs: An illustrated encyclopedia. Timber Press, 1997. .
Flora of North America Association. Flora of North America. Flora of North America Association. .
Flora of North America Editorial Committee. Flora of North America North of Mexico. Oxford University Press, 1993–2006. .
Gerard, John, Thomas Johnson. The herbal; or, General history of plants. Dover Publications, 1975. .
Graf, Alfred Byrd. Exotica Series 4 International: Pictorial Cyclopedia of Exotic Plants from Tropical and Near-Tropical Regions. Scribner's, 12th ed., 1985.
Graf, Alfred Byrd. Hortica: A Color Cyclopedia of Garden Flora in All Climates and Indoor Plants. Macmillan, 1992.
Graf, Alfred Byrd. Tropica: Color Cyclopedia of Exotic Plants. Scribner's, 3rd ed., 1986.
Herwig, Rob. The New Good Housekeeping Encyclopedia of House Plants. Hearst, rev. ed., 1990.
Heywood, V. H., D. M. Moore, I. B. K. Richardson. Flowering plants of the world. Oxford University Press, 1993. .
Heywood, Vernon H. and Stuart R. Chat. Popular Encyclopedia of Plants. Cambridge, 1982.
Hillier's Manual of Trees and Shrubs. Van Nostrand, 5th ed., 1983.
Hogan, Sean. Flora: A gardener's encyclopedia. Timber Press, 2003. .
Hora, Bayard. The Oxford Encyclopedia of Trees of the World. Oxford, 1981.
Kaufman, Sylvan Ramsey, Wallace Kaufman. Invasive plants: A guide to identification and the impacts and control of common North American species. Stackpole Books, 2007. .
Lowe, David W., John R. Matthews, Charles J. Moseley, World Wildlife Fund. The official World Wildlife Fund guide to endangered species of North America. Beacham, 1990–1994. .
Mitchell, Alan. Trees of North America. Facts on File, 1987.
Moore, David M. The Marshall Cavendish Illustrated Encyclopedia of Plants and Earth Sciences. Marshall Cavendish, 1988.
Nelson, Lewis S., Richard Shih, Michael J. Balick, Lewis R. Goldfrank, Andrew Weil, New York Botanical Garden. Handbook of poisonous and injurious plants. New York Botanical Garden; Springer, 2007. .
Ness, Bryan D. Magill's encyclopedia of science: Plant life. Salem Press, 2003. .
Phillips, Ellen and Colston Burrell. Rodale's Illustrated Encyclopedia of Perennials. Rodale, 1993.
Quattrocchi, Umberto. CRC world dictionary of grasses: Common names, scientific names, eponyms, synonyms, and etymology. CRC/Taylor & Francis, 2006. .
Rätsch, Christian, Albert Hofmann, John R. Baker. The encyclopedia of psychoactive plants: Ethnopharmacology and its applications. Park Street Press, 2005. .
Solomon, Jim, Missouri Botanical Garden. W3Tropicos: VAST (VAScular Tropicos) nomenclatural database. Missouri Botanical Garden. .
Spellenberg, Richard. National Audubon Society field guide to North American wildflowers: Western region. Knopf, 2001. .
Stace, Clive A., Hilli Thompson. New flora of the British Isles. Cambridge University Press, 1997. .
Stickney, Robert R. Encyclopedia of aquaculture. Wiley, 2000. .
Thieret, John W, William A. Niering, Nancy C. Olmstead. National Audubon Society field guide to North American wildflowers: eastern region. Alfred A. Knopf, 2001. .
Turner, Nancy J., Adam F. Szczawinski. Common poisonous plants and mushrooms of North America. Timber Press, 1991. .
Webere, Ewald. Invasive plant species of the world: A reference guide to environmental weeds. CABI, 2003. .
Zomlefer, Wendy B. Guide to flowering plant families. University of North Carolina Press, 1994. .

Botany and horticulture 
Bradley, Fern Marshall & Barbara W. Ellis. Rodale's All-New Encyclopedia of Organic Gardening: The Indispensable Resource for Every Gardener. Rodale, 1992.
Brickell, Christopher. American Horticultural Society Encyclopedia of Gardening. Dorling Kindersley. .
Everett, Thomas H. The New York Botanical Garden Illustrated Encyclopedia of Horticulture. Garland, 1981–1982.
Fell, Derek. The Encyclopedia of Flowers. Smithmark, 1993.
Huxley, Anthony. The New Royal Horticultural Society Dictionary of Gardening. Stockton Press, 1992.
Moggi, Guido and Luciano Guignolini. Simon & Schuster's Guide to Garden Flowers. Simon & Schuster, 1983.
Seymour, E. L. D. The Wise Garden Encyclopedia. HarperCollins, rev. ed., 1990.
Shoemaker, Candice A., Chicago Botanic Garden. Encyclopedia of gardens: History and design. Fitzroy Dearborn, 2001. .
Taylor, Patrick. The Oxford companion to the garden. Oxford University Press, 2006. .
Taylor's Encyclopedia of Gardening. Houghton Mifflin, 4th ed., 1961.
Thomas, Brian, Denis J. Murphy, Brian G. Murray. Encyclopedia of applied plant sciences. Elsevier Academic, 2003. . 
Westcott's Plant Disease Handbook. Van Nostrand, 5th ed., 1990.
Woods, Christopher. Encyclopedia of Perennials: A Gardener's Guide. Facts on File, 1982.
Wyman's Gardening Encyclopedia. Macmillan, 2nd ed., 1986.
Yepsen, Roger B., Jr. The Encyclopedia of Natural Insect and Disease Control. Rodale, rev. ed., 1984.

Trees 
Burns, Russell M., Barbara H. Honkala, U. S. Dept. of Agriculture, Forest Service. Silvics of North America. U. S. Dept. of Agriculture, Forest Service. 1990. .
Cafferty, Steve. Firefly encyclopedia of trees. Firefly Books, 2005. .
Davis, Richard C. Encyclopedia of American forest and conservation history. Macmillan; Collier Macmillan, 1983. .
Encyclopedia of Wood: A Tree-by-Tree Guide to the World's Most Versatile Resources. Facts on File, 1989.
Little, Elbert Luther, Sonja Bullaty, Angelo Lomeo, National Audubon Society. The Audubon Society field guide to North American trees. Knopf, 1980. .
Plotnik, Arthur, Mary Phelan Morton Arboretum. The urban tree book: An uncommon field guide for city and town. Three Rivers Press, 2000. .
Preston, Richard Joseph, Richard R. Braham. North American trees. Iowa State Press, 2002. .
Rushforth, Keith, Charles Hollis. National Geographic field guide to the trees of North America. National Geographic, 2006. .
Russell, Tony, Catherine Cutler. Trees: An illustrated identifier and encyclopedia.  Hermes House, 2003. .

Protists

Biochemistry 
Scott, Thomas A. & Mary Brewer. Concise Encyclopedia of Biochemistry. Walter de Gruyter, 2nd ed., 1988.

Bioethics 
Post, Stephen Garrard. Encyclopedia of bioethics. Third edition. Macmillan Reference USA, 2003. . ; DOI:10.1108/09504120510573477.  (5-Volume Set; 3062 pages).
Reich, Warren Thomas Encyclopedia of Bioethics. First edition.  New York: Free Press, 1978.  .  .  (4-Volume Set; 1933 pages)
Reich, Warren Thomas Encyclopedia of Bioethics. Second edition.  New York: Free Press, 1982.  (5-Volume Set; 2950 pages)
Reich, Warren Thomas Encyclopedia of Bioethics. Third edition.  New York: Simon & Schuster Macmillan, 1995; London: Simon and Schuster and Prentice Hall International, c1995. Rev. ed. (5-Volume Set; 2950 pages; 464 articles) . .

Food, nutrition, and agriculture

Agriculture 
American Veterinary Medical Association. AVMA: American Veterinary Medical Association. American Veterinary Medical Association, 2006-..
Arntzen, Charles J. and Ellen M. Ritter. Encyclopedia of agricultural science. Academic Press, 1994. .
Bailey, Liberty Hyde. Cyclopedia of American agriculture. Macmillan, 1909.
Bailey, L. H., Ethel Zoe Bailey, Liberty Hyde Bailey Hortorium. Hortus third: A concise dictionary of plants cultivated in the United States and Canada. Macmillan, 1976. .
Bains, William. Biotechnology from A to Z. Oxford University Press, 2004. .
Brooklyn Botanic Garden, Janet Marinelli, and Stephen K-M. Tim. Brooklyn Botanic Garden gardener's desk reference. Henry Holt, 1998. .
Burns, Russell M., Barbara H. Honkala, U.S. Dept. of Agriculture, Forest Service. Silvics of North America. U.S. Dept. of Agriculture, Forest Service, 1990. .
Burrows, George E. Toxic plants of North America. Wiley-Blackwell, 2012. ..
Cordell, Charles E., U.S. Forest Service. Forest nursery pests. U.S. Department of Agriculture, Forest Service, 1989.
Davis, Richard C. Encyclopedia of American forest and conservation history. Macmillan; Collier Macmillan, 1983. .
Felius, Marleen. Cattle breeds: An encyclopedia. Misset, 1995. .
Flickinger, Michael C. and Steven W. Drew. Encyclopedia of bioprocess technology: Fermentation, biocatalysis, and bioseparation. John Wiley & Sons, 1999. 
Goodman, Robert M. Encyclopedia of plant and crop science. M. Dekker, 2004. . .
Goreham, Gary. Encyclopedia of rural America: The land and people. ABC-CLIO, 1997. .
Hanelt, Peter, R. Buttner, Rudolf Mansfield Institut für Pflanzengenetik und Kulturpflanzenforschung Gatersleben, Germany. Mansfeld's encyclopedia of agricultural and horticultural crops (except ornamentals). Springer, 2001. .
Heldman, Dennis R. Encyclopedia of agricultural, food, and biological engineering. Marcel Dekker, 2003. .
Hillel, Daniel and Jerry L. Hatfield. Encyclopedia of soils in the environment. Elsevier/Academic Press, 2005. . 
Holton, James R., Judith A. Curry, J. A. Pyle. Encyclopedia of atmospheric sciences. Academic Press, 2003. .
Howard, Philip H. Hearth Taub Printup. Handbook of environmental degradation rates. Lewis, 1991. .
Johnson, Warren T., Howard H. Lyon, C. S. Koehler. Insects that feed on trees and shrubs. Comstock Publishing Associates, 1991. .
Knobil, Ernst and Jimmy D. Neill. Encyclopedia of reproduction. Academic Press, 1998. .
Lal, R. Encyclopedia of soil science. Taylor & Francis, 2006. .
Lederberg, Joshua. Encyclopedia of microbiology. Academic Press, 2000. .
Lord, Tony and Andrew Lawson. The encyclopedia of planting combinations: The ultimate visual guide to successful plant harmony. Firefly, 2002. .
Maloy, Otis C. and Timothy D. Murray. Encyclopedia of plant pathology. Wiley, 2001. .
Melhorn, Heinz. Encyclopedia of parasitology. Springer, 2008. .
Montgomery, John H. Agrochemicals desk reference. CRC Press, 1997. .
Nau, Jim. Ball culture guide: The encyclopedia of seed germination. Ball, 1999. .
Plimmer, Jack R. Encyclopedia of agrochemicals. Wiley-Interscience, 2003. .
Quattrocchi, Umberto. CRC world dictionary of grasses: Common names, scientific names, eponyms, synonyms, and etymology. CRC/Taylor & Francis, 2006. .
Roginski, Hubert, John W. Puquay, P. F. Fox. Encyclopedia of dairy sciences. Academic Press, 2003. . .
Schapsmeier, Edward L. and Frederick H. Schapsmeier. Encyclopedia of American Agricultural History. Greenwood, 1975.
Scharpf, Robert, U. S. Forest Service. Diseases of Pacific Coast conifers. Forest Service, U.S. Dept. of Agriculture, 1993. .
Solomon, J. D., U.S. Dept. of Agriculture, Forest Service. Guide to insect borers in North American broadleaf trees and shrubs. U.S. Dept. of Agriculture, Forest Service, 1995.
Stickney, Robert R. Encyclopedia of aquaculture. Wiley, 2000. .
Talbot, Ross B. Historical dictionary of the international food agencies: FAO, WFP, WFC, IFAD. Scarecrow Press, 1994. .
Thomas, Brian, Denis J. Murphy, Brian G. Murray. Encyclopedia of applied plant sciences. Elsevier Academic, 2003. .
U. S. Food and Drug Administration. FDA directory. Food and Drug Law Institute, 1900s–.
Wexler, Philip, Bruce D. Anderson, Ann de Peyster. Encyclopedia of toxicology. Elsevier Academic, 2005. .
Wrigley, Colin W., Harold Corke, Charles E. Walker. Encyclopedia of grain science. Elsevier Academic Press, 2004. .

Food 
Albala, Ken. Food cultures of the world encyclopedia. Greenwood, 2011. .
Claiborne, Craig. The New York Times Food Encyclopedia. Times Books, 1985.
Considine, Douglas M. & Glenn D. Considine. Foods and Food Production Encyclopedia. Van Nostrand, 1982.
Coyle, L. Patrick, Jr.. The World Encyclopedia of Food. Facts on File, 1982.
Encyclopedia of Food Engineering. 2nd ed., AVI Publishing, 1986.
Encyclopedia of Food Science. AVI Publishing, 1978.
Encyclopedia of Food Technology. AVI Publishing, 1974.
Ensminger, Audrey H. Foods and Nutrition Encyclopedia. Pegus Press, 1983.
Francis, F. J. Encyclopedia of food science and technology. Wiley, 2000. .
Horn, Jane and Janet Fletcher. Cooking A to Z. Ortho Books, 1988.
Hui, Y. H. Encyclopedia of Food Science and Technology. Wiley, 1992.
Hui, Y. H., and J. D. Culbertson. Handbook of food science, technology, and engineering. Taylor & Francis, 2006. .
Kraig, Bruce and Colleen Taylor Sen. Street food around the world: an encyclopedia of food and culture. ABC-CLIO, 2013. .
Macrae, Robert. Encyclopedia of Food Science, Food Technology, and Nutrition. Academic Press, 1993.
Mariani, John F. The Dictionary of American Food and Drink. 2nd ed., Hearst, 1994.
Montagne, Prosper & Robert J. Courtine. Larousse Gastronomique: All-New American Edition of the World's Greatest Culinary Encyclopedia. Rev. ed., Crown, 1988.
Stobart, Tom. Cook's Encyclopedia. Harper & Row, 1981.

Nutrition 
Ensminger, Audrey H. Foods and Nutrition Encyclopedia. Pegus Press, 1983.
Food for Health: A Nutrition Encyclopedia. Pegus Press, 1986.
Margen, Sheldon. The Wellness Encyclopedia of Food and Nutrition: How to Buy, Store, and Prepare Every Variety of Fresh Food. Rebus, 1992.
Mount Sinai School of Medicine Complete Book of Nutrition. St. Martin's Press, 1990.
Tver, David F. and Percy Russell. Nutrition and Health Encyclopedia. 2nd ed., Van Nostrand, 1989.
Winick, Myron. The Columbia Encyclopedia of Nutrition. Putnam, 1988.
Yudin, John. Penguin Encyclopedia of Nutrition. Viking, 1985.

Wines, beers, and spirits 
Alexis Lichine's New Encyclopedia of Wines and Spirits. 5th ed., Knopf, 1987.
Grossman's Guide to Wines, Beers, & Spirits. 7th ed., Scribner's, 1983.
Hugh Johnson's Modern Encyclopedia of Wine. 3rd ed., Simon & Schuster, 1991.
Hugh Johnson's World Atlas of Wine. 3rd ed., Simon & Schuster, 1985.
Robinson, Jancis. The Oxford companion to wine. Oxford University Press, 1999. .
Schoonmaker, Frank. The New Frank Schoonmaker Encyclopedia of Wine. Rev. ed., Morrow, 1988.

Health, medicine, and drugs 
Adelman, George. Encyclopedia of Neuroscience. Birkhauser Boston, 1987.
Fishbein, Morris. Fishbein's Illustrated Medical and Health Encyclopedia. H. S. Struttman, 1983.
Who's who in medicine and healthcare. Marquis Who's Who, 1996–. .

Drugs 
Plumb, Donald C. Plumb's veterinary drug handbook. PharmaVet ; Distributed by Wiley, c2011. .
Rätsch, Christian, Albert Hofmann, John R. Baker. The encyclopedia of psychoactive plants: Ethnopharmacology and its applications. Park Street Press, 2005. .
Stafford, Peter. Psychedelics Encyclopedia. 3rd ed., Ronin Publishing, 1992.
Swarbrick, James and James C. Boylan. Encyclopedia of Pharmaceutical Technology. Marcel Dekker, 1988-.

Drug and alcohol abuse 
Evans, Glen. The Encyclopedia of Drug Abuse. 2nd ed., Facts on File, 1991.
Fay, John. Alcohol/Drug Abuse Dictionary and Encyclopedia. Charles C. Thomas, 1988.
O'Brien, Robert & Morris Chaftetz. The Encyclopedia of Alcoholism. 2nd ed., Facts on File, 1991.

Health 

Fink, George. Encyclopedia of stress. Elsevier, 2007. .

Macmillan Health Encyclopedia. Macmillan, 1993.
The Marshall Cavendish Encyclopedia of Family Health. Marshall Cavendish, 1991.

U.S. National Library Medicine (2012): MedlinePlus including the freely accessible Medical Encyclopedia.

Wellness Encyclopedia. Houghton Mifflin, 1991.

Physical disorders 
Wynbrandt, James & Mark D. Ludman. The Encyclopedia of Genetic Disorders and Birth Defects. Facts on File, 1991.

Hearing disorders 
Turkington, Carol and Allen Sussman. Encyclopedia of Deafness and Hearing Disorders. Facts on File, 1992.
Van Cleve, John V. Gallaudet Encyclopedia of Deaf People and Deafness. McGraw-Hill, 1987.

Vision impairment 
Sardegna, Jill & T. Otis Paul. The Encyclopedia of Blindness and Vision Impairment. Facts on File, 1991.

Women's health 
Ammer, Christine. The New A to Z of Women's Health: A Concise Encyclopedia. Facts on File, 1989.
Foley, Denise and Eileen Nechas. Women's Encyclopedia of Health & Emotional Healing. Rodale, 1993.
New Our Bodies, Ourselves. Rev. ed., Simon & Schuster, 1992.

Medicine 
Bailey, Hamilton, W. J. Bishop, Harold Ellis. Bailey and Bishop's notable names in medicine and surgery. Lewis, 1983. .
Bendiner, Jessica, Elmer Bendiner. Biographical dictionary of medicine. Facts on File, 1990. .
Berkow, Robert. The Merck Manual of Diagnosis and Therapy. 16th ed., Merck, 1992.
Bremer, Sydney, Jeffrey H. Miller, William Broughton. Encyclopedia of genetics. Academic Press, 2002. .
Bynum, W. F., Helen Bynum. Dictionary of medical biography. Greenwood Press, 2006. .
Clayman, Charles B. The American Medical Association Encyclopedia of Medicine. Random House, 1989.
Delves, Peter J., Ivan M. Roitt. Encyclopedia of immunology. Academic Press, 1998. .
Fischer, Isidor. Biographisches Lexikon der hervorragenden Ärzte der letzten 50 Jahre. 1932–33.
Ganten, Detlev, Klaus Ruckpaul. Encyclopedic reference of genomics and proteomics in molecular medicine. Springer, 2005. .
Gomez, Joan. Dictionary of Symptoms. Rev. ed., Stein & Day, 1985.
Griffith, H. Winter. Complete Guide to Symptoms, Illness & Surgery. 2nd ed., Price Stern Sloan, 1989.
Hafner, Arthur Wayne, Fred W. Hunter, B. Michael Tarpey. Directory of deceased American physicians, 1804–1929: A genealogical guide to over 149,000 medical practitioners providing brief biographical sketches drawn from the American Medical Association's Deceased Physician Masterfile. American Medical Association, c1993. .
Hirsch, August, Ernst Julius Gurlt, A. Wernich, W. Haberling. Biographisches Lexikon der hervorragenden Ärzte aller Zeiten und Völker. Urban & Schwarzenberg, 1929–1934. (German) 
Jorde, Lynn B. Encyclopedia of genetics, genomics, proteomics, and bioinformatics. John Wiley and Sons, 2005. .
Kahl, Günter. The dictionary of gene technology: Genomics, transcriptomics, proteomics. Wiley-VCH, 2004. .
Kaufman, Martin, Stuart Galishoff, Todd Lee Savitt. Dictionary of American medical biography. Greenwood Press, 1984. .
Kazazian, Haig H., John Wiley & Sons. Wiley encyclopedia of molecular medicine. John Wiley & Sons, 2002. .
Kaufman, Martin, Joellen Watson Hawkins, Loretta P. Higgins, Alice Howell Friedman. Dictionary of American nursing biography. Greenwood Press, 1988. .
Kelly, Howard A., Walter L. Burrage. Dictionary of American medical biography: Lives of eminent physicians of the United States and Canada, from the earliest times. London: D. Appleton and Co., 1928.
Leroy, Francis. A century of Nobel prize recipients: Chemistry, physics, and medicine. Marcel Dekker, 2003. .
Levin, Beatrice. Women and medicine. Scarecrow Press, 2002. .
Magner, Lois N. Doctors, nurses, and medical practitioners: A bio-bibliographical sourcebook. Greenwood Press, 1997. .
Marquis Who's Who. Who's who in medicine and healthcare. Marquis Who's Who, 1996-.
Martin, Edward A., Peter Froggatt. A biographical encyclopedia of medical travel authors. Edwin Mellen Press, 2010–. .
Meyers, Robert A. Encyclopedia of molecular cell biology and molecular medicine. Wiley-VCH Verlag, 2004–2005. .
Miller, Sigmund. Symptoms: The Complete Home Medical Encyclopedia. Crowell, 1976.
Mosby Medical Encyclopedia. Rev. ed., Penguin USA, 1992.
Munk, William, G. H. Brown, Richard Robertson Trail. The roll of the Royal College of Physicians of London: Comprising biographical sketches of all the eminent physicians whose names are recorded in the Annals... Royal College of Physicians of London, 1878–.
Pagel, Julius. Biographisches Lexikon hervorragender Ärzte des neunzehnten Jahrhunderts. Urban & Schwarzenberg, 1901. (German).
Physician's Desk Reference. Medical Economics, 1947-.
Pinzon, Soledad Mata, Carlos Zolla, Diego Méndez Granados Instituto Nacional Indigenista (Mexico). Diccionario enciclopédico de la medicina tradicional mexicana. Instituto Nacional Indigenista, 1994. .
Rédei, G. P. Encyclopedic dictionary of genetics, genomics, and proteomics. Wiley-Liss, 2003. .
Riott, Ivan M. & Peter J. Delves. Encyclopedia of Immunology. Academic Press, 1992.
Rosenfeld, Isadore. Symptoms. Simon & Schuster, 1989.
Rothenberg, Robert. New Illustrated Medical Encyclopedia for Home Use. Rev. ed., Galahad, 1986.
Scrivener, Laurice, J. Suzanne Barnes. A biographical dictionary of women healers: Midwives, nurses, and physicians. Oryx Press, 2002. .
Talbot, C. H., Eugene Ashby Hammond. The medical practitioners in medieval England: A biographical register. Wellcome Historical Medical Library, 1965.
Tver, David F. & Howard F. Hunt. Encyclopedic Dictionary of Sports Medicine. Routledge, Chapman & Hall, 1986.
Walton, John. The Oxford Companion to Medicine. Oxford, 1986.
Webster, John G. Encyclopedia of Medical Devices and Instrumentation. Wiley, 1988.
Windsor, Laura Lynn. Women in medicine: An encyclopedia. ABC-CLIO, 2002. .
The World Book/Rush-Presbyterian-St. Luke's Medical Center Medical Encyclopedia: Your Guide to Good Health. World Book, 1991.

History of medicine 
Bynum, W. F. and Roy Porter. Companion Encyclopedia of the History of Medicine. Routledge, 1994.
McGrew, Roderick E. and Margaret P. McGrew. Encyclopedia of Medical History. McGraw-Hill, 1985.

Medical ethics 
Boyd, Kenneth M., Roger Higgs, A. J. Pinching. The new dictionary of medical ethics. BMJ Publ., 1997. .

Medical tests 
Griffith, H. Winter. Complete Guide to Medical Tests. Fisher Books, 1988.
Pinckney, Cathey and Edward R. Pinckney. Do-It-Yourself Medical Testing. 3rd ed., Facts on File, 1989.
Pinckney, Cathey and Edward R. Pinckney. The Patient's Guide to Medical Tests. 3rd ed., Facts on File, 1986.
Shtasel, Philip. Medical Tests and Diagnostic Procedures. HarperCollins, 1991.
Sobel, David and Tom Ferguson. People's Book of Medical Tests. Summit Books, 1985.

Natural and alternative medicine 
Bricklin, Mark. Practical Encyclopedia of Natural Healing. Rev. ed., Rodale, 1983.
Bricklin, Mark. Rodale's Encyclopedia of Natural Home Remedies. Rodale, 1982.
Murray, Michael T. & Joseph E. Pizzorno. An Encyclopedia of Natural Medicine. Prima Publishing, 1991.
Olsen, Kristin. Encyclopedia of Alternative Health Care. Pocket Books, 1990.
Visual Encyclopedia of Natural Healing. Rodale, 1991.
Wade, Carlson. Home Encyclopedia of Symptoms, Ailments, and Their Natural Remedies. Parker, 1991.

Nursing 
Marquis Who's Who. Who's who in American nursing. Marquis Who's Who, 1984-.

Veterinary medicine 
American Veterinary Medical Association. AVMA: American Veterinary Medical Association. American Veterinary Medical Association, 2006-..
Concise Veterinary Dictionary. Oxford, 1988.
Griffin, James and Tom Gore. Horse Owner's Veterinary Handbook. Howell Book House, 1989.
Merck Veterinary Manual. Merck.
Plumb, Donald C. Plumb's veterinary drug handbook. PharmaVet ; Distributed by Wiley, c2011. .
West, Geoffrey. Black's Veterinary Dictionary. Barnes & Noble Books, 1992.

Microbiology 
Britton, Gabriel. Encyclopedia of environmental microbiology. Wiley, 2002. .
Lederberg, Joshua. Encyclopedia of microbiology. Academic Press, 2000. .

Neuroscience 
Houdé, Olivier Daniel Kayser, Vivian Waltz, Christian Cav. Dictionary of cognitive science: Neuroscience, psychology, artificial intelligence, linguistics, and philosophy. Psychology Press, 2004. .

Prehistoric life 
Dixon, Dougal. The Macmillan Illustrated Encyclopedia of Dinosaurs and Prehistoric Animals: A Visual Who's Who of Prehistoric Life. Macmillan, 1988.
Encyclopedia of Prehistoric Life. McGraw-Hill, 1979.

Shells 
Abbott, Tucker and Peter Dance. Compendium of Seashells. American Melacologists, 4th ed., 1990.
Collector's Encyclopedia of Shells. McGraw-Hill, 1982.
Rehder, Harald Alfred, James H. Carmichael, Jr., Carol Nehring, National Audubon Society. The Audubon Society field guide to North American seashells. Knopf, 1981. .
Wye, Kenneth F. The Encyclopedia of Shells. Facts on File, 1991.
Murray, Michael T.

Footnotes

References 
Guide to Reference.  American Library Association. Retrieved 5 December 2014. (subscription required).
Kister, Kenneth F. (1994). Kister's Best Encyclopedias (2nd ed.). Phoenix: Oryx. .
Kroeger, Alice Bertha, Isadore Gilbert Mudge. (1911). Guide to the Study and Use of Reference books. Chicago: American Library Association.
 

Biology
Biology
Bio